Cornelius Lucy (6 February 1899 – 14 July 1929) was an Irish hurler and Gaelic footballer. His championship career with the Cork senior teams lasted from 1916 until 1922.

Lucy first played competitive inter-county football at the age of seventeen when he was selected for the Cork senior team. He made his debut during the 1916 championship and won a Munster medal in his first season. Lucy later joined the Cork senior hurling team and won an All-Ireland medal in 1919. He also won back-to-back Munster medals. Lucy played his last game for Cork in May 1922.

Honours

Cork
All-Ireland Senior Hurling Championship (1): 1919
Munster Senior Hurling Championship (2): 1919, 1920
Munster Senior Football Championship (1): 1916

References

1899 births
1929 deaths
UCC hurlers
UCC Gaelic footballers
Cork inter-county hurlers
Cork inter-county Gaelic footballers